Each "article" in this category is a collection of entries about several stamp issuers, presented in alphabetical order. The entries are formulated on the micro model and so provide summary information about all known issuers.  

See the :Category:Compendium of postage stamp issuers page for details of the project.

Mecklenburg-Schwerin 

Dates 	1856–1868
Capital 	Schwerin
Currency 	48 schillings = 1 thaler

Refer 	German States

Mecklenburg-Strelitz 

Dates 	1864–1868
Capital 	Strelitz
Currency 	30 silbergroschen = 1 thaler

Refer 	German States

Mecklenburg-Vorpommern (Russian Zone) 

Dates 	1945–1946
Capital 	Schwerin
Currency 	100 pfennige = 1 mark

Refer 	Germany (Allied Occupation)

MEF 

Refer 	Middle East Forces (MEF)

Melaka 

Refer 	Malacca

Memel (French Administration) 

Dates 	1920–1923
Currency 	100 pfennige = 1 mark

Refer 	French Occupation Issues

Memel (Lithuanian Occupation) 

Refer 	Klaipėda

Mengkiang (Japanese Occupation) 

Dates 	1942–1945
Currency 	100 cents = 1 dollar

Refer 	Japanese Occupation Issues

Mengtse 

Refer 	Mong-Tseu (Indochinese Post Offices)

Mesopotamia 

Refer 	Mosul (Indian Forces)

Metelin 

Refer 	Mytilene (Russian Post Office)

Mexico 

Dates 	1856 –
Capital 	Mexico City
Currency 	8 reales = 100 centavos = 1 peso

Micronesia, Federated States of 

Dates 	1984 –
Capital       Palikir
	
Currency 	100 cents = 1 dollar

Main Article  Postage stamps and postal history of the Federated States of Micronesia

Middle Congo 

Dates 	1907–1937
Capital 	Brazzaville
Currency 	100 centimes = 1 franc

Main Article Needed 

See also 	Congo Republic;
		French Congo;
		French Equatorial Africa

Middle East Forces (MEF) 

Dates 	1942–1947
Currency  	12 pence = 1 shilling; 20 shillings = 1 pound

Main Article Needed 

See also 	BA/BMA Issues;
		British Occupation Issues;
		Egypt (British Forces)

Midway Islands 

Refer 	United States of America (USA)

Modena 

Dates 	1852–1860
Capital 	Modena
Currency 	100 centesimi = 1 lira

Refer 	Italian States

Moheli 

Dates 	1906–1914
Capital 	
Currency 	100 centimes = 1 franc

Refer 	Madagascar & Dependencies

Moldavia 

Dates 	1858–1862
Capital 	Iași
Currency 	40 parale = 1 piastre

Refer 	Romania

Moldo-Wallachia 

Dates 	1862–1865
Capital 	Bucharest
Currency 	40 parale = 1 piastre

Refer 	Romania

Moldova 

Dates 	1991 –
Capital 	Kishinev
Currency 	(1991) 100 kopecks = 1 Russian ruble
		(1993) kupon (temporary currency)
		(1993) 100 bani = 1 leu

Main Article Postage stamps and postal history of Moldova

See also 	Union of Soviet Socialist Republics (USSR)

Moluccas 

Refer 	Japanese Naval Control Area

Monaco 

Dates 	1885 –
Capital 	Monte Carlo
Currency 	(1885) 100 centimes = 1 franc
		(2002) 100 cent = 1 euro

Main Article Needed

Mongolia 

Dates 	1924 –
Capital 	Ulan Bator
Currency 	(1924) 100 cents = 1 Mongolian dollar
		(1926) 100 möngö = 1 Mongolian tögrög

Main Article Needed

Mong-Tseu (Indochinese Post Office) 

Dates 	1903–1922
Currency 	(1903) 100 centimes = 1 franc
		(1919) 100 cents = 1 piastre

Refer 	China (Indochinese Post Offices)

Mongtze 

Refer 	Mong-Tseu (Indochinese Post Offices)

Mont-Athos 

Refer 	Mount Athos (Russian Post Office)

Montenegro 

Dates 	1874–1918; 2006 –
Capital 	Podgorica
Currency 	(1874) 100 novcic = 1 florin
		(1902) 100 heller = 1 krone
		(1907) 100 para = 1 krone (note: in 1910 only, krone were called perper)
		(2006) 100 cent = 1 euro

Main Article Needed 

Includes 	Montenegro (Yugoslav Regional Issues)

See also 	Yugoslavia

Montenegro (Austrian Occupation) 

Dates 	1917 only
Currency 	100 heller = 1 krone

Refer 	Austro–Hungarian Military Post

Montenegro (German Occupation) 

Dates 	1943–1945
Currency 	(1943) 100 centesimi = 1 lira
		(1944) 100 pfennige = 1 mark

Refer 	German Occupation Issues (WW2)

Montenegro (Italian Occupation) 

Dates 	1941–1943
Currency 	(1941) 100 paras = 1 dinar
		(1941) 100 centesimi = 1 lira

Refer 	Italian Occupation Issues

Montenegro (Yugoslav Regional Issues) 

Dates 	1945 only
Capital 	Titograd (Podgorica)
Currency 	100 centesimi = 1 lira

Refer 	Montenegro

Montserrat 

Dates 	1876 –
Capital 	Plymouth
Currency  	(1876) 12 pence = 1 shilling; 20 shillings = 1 pound
		(1951) 100 cents = 1 dollar

Main Article Needed

Morocco 

Dates 	1956  –
Capital 	Rabat
Currency 	(1956) 100 centimos = 1 peseta (Northern Zone)
		(1956) 100 centimes = 1 franc (Southern Zone)
		(1958) 100 centimes = 1 franc (whole country)
		(1962) 100 francs = 1 dirham

Includes 	Northern Zone, Morocco;
		Sherifian Post;
		Southern Zone, Morocco

Morocco Agencies 

Dates 	1898–1957
Currency 	British, French and Spanish all used

Main Article Needed 

See also 	Tangier

Morocco (British Post Offices) 

Refer 	Morocco Agencies

Morocco (French Post Offices) 

Dates 	1862–1914
Currency  	100 centimos = 1 peseta

Refer 	French Post Offices Abroad

Morocco (German Post Offices) 

Dates 	1899–1917
Currency  	100 centimos = 1 peseta

Refer 	German Post Offices Abroad

Morocco (Spanish Post Offices) 

Dates 	1903–1914
Currency  	100 centimos = 1 peseta

Refer 	Spanish Post Offices Abroad

Morvi 

Dates 	1931–1948
Currency 	12 pies = 1 anna; 16 annas = 1 rupee

Refer 	Indian Native States

Mosul (Indian Forces) 

Dates 	1919 only
Currency 	12 pies = 1 anna; 16 annas = 1 rupee

Refer 	Indian Overseas Forces

Mount Athos (Russian Post Office) 

Dates 	1909–1914
Currency  	40 paras = 1 piastre

Refer 	Russian Post Offices in the Turkish Empire

Moyen Congo 

Refer 	Middle Congo

Mozambique 

Dates 	1876 –
Capital 	Maputo (formerly Lourenço Marques)
Currency 	(1876) 1000 reis = 1 milreis
		(1913) 100 centavos = 1 escudo
		(1980) 100 centavos = 1 metical

Main Article Needed 

See also 	Africa (Portuguese Colonies)

Mozambique Company 

Dates 	1892–1942
Currency 	(1892) 1000 reis = 1 milreis
		(1913) 100 centavos = 1 escudo

Main Article Needed

Mozambique Territories 

Main Article Needed 

Includes 	Inhambane;
		Kionga;
		Lourenço Marques;
		Quelimane;
		Tete;
		Zambezia

Muscat 

Dates 	1944–1948
Capital 	Muscat
Currency  	12 pies = 1 anna, 16 annas = 1 rupee

Refer 	Muscat & Oman

See also 	British Postal Agencies in Eastern Arabia;
		Oman

Muscat & Oman 

Dates 	1966–1970
Capital 	Muscat
Currency  	(1966) 64 baizas = 1 rupee;
		(1970) 1000 baizas = 1 rial saidi

Main Article Needed 

Includes 	Muscat

See also 	British Postal Agencies in Eastern Arabia;
		Oman

Mustique 

Refer 	Grenadines of St Vincent

Mutawakelite Kingdom 

Refer 	Yemen (Mutawakelite Kingdom)

Myanmar 

Refer 	Burma

Mytilene (Russian Post Office) 

Dates 	1909–1914
Currency 	40 paras = 1 piastre

Refer 	Russian Post Offices in the Turkish Empire

References

Bibliography
 Stanley Gibbons Ltd, Europe and Colonies 1970, Stanley Gibbons Ltd, 1969
 Stanley Gibbons Ltd, various catalogues
 Stuart Rossiter & John Flower, The Stamp Atlas, W H Smith, 1989
 XLCR Stamp Finder and Collector's Dictionary, Thomas Cliffe Ltd, c.1960

External links
 AskPhil – Glossary of Stamp Collecting Terms
 Encyclopaedia of Postal History

Me